Fight Back To School is a 1991 Hong Kong comedy film directed by Gordon Chan and starring Stephen Chow. This film is set in Shatin College, Hong Kong.

It was Hong Kong's highest-grossing film of 1991. It was followed by sequels Fight Back to School II (1992) and Fight Back to School III (1993).

Plot
Chow Sing-Sing (Stephen Chow) is about to be disqualified from the Royal Hong Kong Police's elite Special Duties Unit (SDU) because of his complete disregard for his teammates during a drill. However, a senior officer, who has taken to Sing's youthful demeanour, instead deploys him as an undercover student into Edinburgh College to recover a stolen revolver. Sing, who turned to the Police Academy because of his dislike for schooling, struggles to fit in academically. The undercover operation is made complicated when Star is partnered with Tat—an ageing, incompetent police detective (Ng Man-Tat).

Star still manages to fall in love with Ms Ho (Cheung Man), the school's guidance counsellor, as well as disrupting a gang involved in arms-dealing.

Cast
Cast and roles include:
 Stephen Chow - Star Chow / Chow Sing-Sing
 Sharla Cheung - Miss Ho
 Ng Man-tat - Tso Tat-Wah / 'Uncle' Tat
 Roy Cheung - Brother Teddy Big
 Barry Wong - Police Commissioner
 Gabriel Wong - Turtle Wong
 Paul Chun - Lam
 Dennis Chan
 Peter Lai
 Nicholas Laletin
 Roger Thomas
 Tsang Kan-Wing
 Karel Ng
 Kingdom Yuen - Miss Leung

Award nominations

References

External links
 

1991 films
1991 comedy films
1990s Cantonese-language films
Films set in Hong Kong
Films directed by Gordon Chan
Hong Kong comedy films
1990s Hong Kong films